Mehdiabad-e Yek may refer to:
 Mehdiabad-e Yek, Chaharmahal and Bakhtiari
 Mehdiabad-e Yek, Kerman